Kaneshie is a suburb in the Accra Metropolitan district, a district of the Greater Accra Region of Ghana. The name was derived from a word in the Ga-Adangbe , that is "Kane Shie Shie", meaning "under the lamp" referring to its beginnings as a night market.

Education
Kaneshie is known for the Kaneshie Secondary Technical School. The school is a second cycle institution.
Other Educational establishments in and around Kaneshie include;
Accra Academy
 Grace Prep. School
 St. Theresa Catholic School
 KA Awudome Cluster of Schools
 Prince of Peace International School
 Rev. J.T Clegg Mem. Methodist School 
 Winston-Salem Prep. Sch.
 Starward Prep. Sch. 
 Jahrock Prep. Sch.

Healthcare
 The Eden Family Hospital is located in Kaneshie
 Cocoa Clinic
 Holy Trinity Hospital
 Kaneshie Polyclinic
 Lighthouse Medical Mission Hospital and Fertility Centre
 Greenhand Hospital

Notable places
 Kaneshie market
 Azumah Nelson Sports Complex
 Awudome Cemetery
 Zoozoo Restaurant
 Ga Mantse (Chief) Palace
 The Qodesh (Lighthouse Chapel)
 St. Theresa Catholic Church
 Rev. Joseph Thomas Clegg Mem. Methodist Church 
 Accra Academy 
 Accra Wesley Girls High School 
 Kaneshie Senior High School 
 Honest Cheff 
 Papaye Restaurant 
 Cocoa Clinic 
 Greenhand Hospital
Solid Rock Chapel International

References

External links
 Kaneshie - Google Map

Populated places in the Greater Accra Region